The Common Wealth Trust Ltd or locally referred to as Basel Mission tile factory run by the German missionary Plebot (Georg Plebst in reality), with an un-named Indian master-potter, was the first Mangalore tile manufacturing factory to be set up in India in 1860 on banks of the Nethravathi river near Morgan's Gate, about  from the Ullal bridge.

See also
Codacal Tile Factory

Citiations

References

Companies based in Mangalore
Indian companies established in 1860
Manufacturing companies established in 1860